The 1984 Cork Intermediate Hurling Championship was the 75th staging of the Cork Intermediate Hurling Championship since its establishment by the Cork County Board in 1909. The draw for the opening round fixtures took place on 29 January 1984. The championship began on 12 May 1984 and ended on 19 August 1984.

On 19 August 1984, Erin's Own won the championship following a 0-15 to 1-05 defeat of Cloughduv in the final at Páirc Uí Chaoimh. This as their first championship title.

Castletownroche's Dave Relihan was the championship's top scorer with 2-15.

Team changes

From Championship

Regraded to the City Junior A Hurling Championship
 Glen Rovers

To Championship

Promoted from the Cork Junior A Hurling Championship
 St. Catherine's

Results

First round

Second round

Quarter-finals

Semi-finals

Final

Championship statistics

Top scorers

Overall

In a single game

References

Cork Intermediate Hurling Championship
Cork Intermediate Hurling Championship